The 1856–57 United States House of Representatives elections were held on various dates in various states between August 4, 1856 and November 4, 1857. Each state set its own date for its elections to the House of Representatives. 236 representatives were elected in 31 states and the pending new state of Minnesota before the first session of the 35th United States Congress convened on December 7, 1857.

The elections briefly returned a semblance of normalcy to the Democratic Party, restoring its House majority alongside election of Democratic President James Buchanan.  However, superficial victory masked severe, ultimately irretrievable divisions over slavery.  Voters next would return a Democratic House majority only in 1874.

Party realignments continued.  In 1856, the Whig Party disbanded, the Know Nothing movement declined, and its vehicle, the American Party, began to collapse.  Many Northern Whig, American, and other Opposition Party Representatives joined the new, rapidly consolidating Republican Party, which contested the Presidency in 1856. Though the Republican Party did not yet demand abolition, its attitude toward slavery was stridently negative. It was an openly sectional Northern party opposing fugitive slave laws and slavery in the territories, and for the first time offered a mainstream platform to outspoken abolitionists.

In March 1857, after almost all Northern states had voted, the Supreme Court issued its infamous Dred Scott decision, amplifying tensions and hardening voter divisions. Remaining elections were concentrated in the South. Southern voters widely drove the American Party from office, rallying to the Democrats in firm opposition to the Republicans.

In October 1857, the pending new state of Minnesota elected its first Representatives, to be seated by the 35th Congress.  Between the admissions of Vermont in 1791 and Wisconsin in 1848, Congress had admitted new states roughly in pairs: one slave, one free.  California was admitted alone as a free state in 1850 only as part of a comprehensive compromise including significant concessions to slave state interests.  Admission of Minnesota in May 1858, also alone but with no such deal, helped expose the declining influence of the South, destroying the formerly binding concept that slave and free state power was best kept in balance even in the Senate while solidifying a sense that the West would exclude slavery.

Election summaries 
Two seats were added for the new state of Minnesota, which was unrepresented for part of the 1st session.

Special elections 

There were a total of thirteen special elections in 1856 and 1857 during the 34th and 35th Congresses.

34th Congress 

|-
! 
| Laurence M. Keitt
|  | Democratic
| 1853
| Incumbent resigned July 15, 1856, following the caning of Charles Sumner.Incumbent re-elected July 29, 1856.
| nowrap | 

|-
! 
| Preston Brooks
|  | Democratic
| 1853
| Incumbent resigned July 15, 1856, following the caning of Charles Sumner.Incumbent re-elected July 29, 1856.
| nowrap | 

|-
! 
| John Gaines Miller
|  | Whig
| 1850
|  | Incumbent died May 11, 1856.New member elected August 4, 1856.Know Nothing gain.Winner was not candidate for full term, see below.
| nowrap | 

|-
! 
| William Alexander Richardson
|  | Democratic
| 1847 
|  | Incumbent resigned August 25, 1856, to run for governor of Illinois.New member elected November 4, 1856.Winner was not candidate for full term, see below.
| nowrap | 

|-
! 
| James C. Allen
|  | Democratic
| 1852
| Incumbent resigned July 18, 1856, amid election challenge.Incumbent re-elected November 4, 1856.Winner was not candidate for full term, see below.
| nowrap | 

|-
! 
| colspan=3 | Vacant
|  | Rep.-elect Lyman Trumbull (D) was later elected U.S. senator and took office March 4, 1855.New member elected November 4, 1856.Democratic hold.Winner was not candidate for full term, see below.
| nowrap | 

|-
! 
| Thomas H. Bayly
|  | Democratic
| 1853
|  | Incumbent died June 23, 1856.New member elected November 4, 1856.Democratic hold.
| nowrap | 

|-
! 
| John Wilkins Whitfield
|  | Democratic
| 1854
| Seat declared vacant August 1, 1856.Incumbent re-elected November 5, 1856.
| nowrap | 

|-
! 
| James Meacham
|  | Whig
| 1849 
|  | Incumbent died August 23, 1856.New member elected December 1, 1856.Republican gain.
| nowrap | 

|}

35th Congress 

|-
! 
| colspan=3 | Vacant
|  | Rep.-elect James S. Green (D) was later elected U.S. senator and took office January 12, 1857.New member elected August 3, 1857.Democratic hold.
| nowrap | 

|-
! 
| James Lockhart
|  | Democratic
| 18511852 1856
|  | Incumbent died September 7, 1857.New member elected October 7, 1857.Democratic hold.
| nowrap | 

|-
! 
| Samuel Brenton
|  | Republican
| 1854
|  | Incumbent died March 29, 1857.New member elected October 7, 1857.Republican hold.
| nowrap | 

|-
! 
| John Gallagher Montgomery
|  | Democratic
| 1856
|  | Incumbent died April 24, 1857.New member elected October 13, 1857.Democratic hold.
| nowrap | 

|}

Alabama 

|-
! 
| Percy Walker
|  | Know Nothing
| 1855
|  | Incumbent retired.New member elected.Democratic gain.
| nowrap | 

|-
! 
| Eli Sims Shorter
|  | Democratic
| 1855
| Incumbent re-elected.
| nowrap | 

|-
! 
| James Ferguson Dowdell
|  | Democratic
| 1853
| Incumbent re-elected.
| nowrap | 

|-
! 
| William Russell Smith
|  | Know Nothing
| 1851
|  | Incumbent lost re-election.New member elected.Democratic gain.
| nowrap | 

|-
! 
| George S. Houston
|  | Democratic
| 18411849 1851
| Incumbent re-elected.
| nowrap | 

|-
! 
| Williamson Robert Winfield Cobb
|  | Democratic
| 1847
| Incumbent re-elected.
| nowrap | 

|-
! 
| Sampson Willis Harris
|  | Democratic
| 1847
|  | Incumbent retired.New member elected.Democratic hold.
| nowrap | 

|}

Arkansas 

|-
! 
| Alfred B. Greenwood
|  | Democratic
| 1853
| Incumbent re-elected.
| nowrap | 

|-
! 
| Albert Rust
|  | Democratic
| 1854
|  | Incumbent lost renomination.New member elected.Democratic hold.
| nowrap | 

|}

California 

|-
! rowspan=2 | 
| James W. Denver
|  | Democratic
| 1854
|  | Incumbent retired.New member elected.Democratic hold.
| rowspan=2 nowrap | 

|-
| Philemon T. Herbert
|  | Democratic
| 1854
|  | Incumbent retired after manslaughter acquittal.New member elected.Democratic hold.

|}

Connecticut 

|-
! 
| Ezra Clark Jr.
|  | Know Nothing
| 1855
|  | Incumbent re-elected to a new party.Republican gain.
| nowrap | 

|-
! 
| John Woodruff
|  | Know Nothing
| 1855
|  | Incumbent lost re-election.New member elected.Democratic gain.
| nowrap | 

|-
! 
| Sidney Dean
|  | Know Nothing
| 1855
|  | Incumbent re-elected to a new party.Republican gain.
| nowrap | 

|-
! 
| William W. Welch
|  | Know Nothing
| 1855
|  | Incumbent retired.New member elected.Democratic gain.
| nowrap | 

|}

Delaware 

|-
! 
| Elisha D. Cullen
|  | Know Nothing
| 1854
|  | Incumbent lost re-election.New member elected.Democratic gain.
| nowrap | 

|}

Florida 

|-
! 
| Augustus Maxwell
|  | Democratic
| 1852
|  | Incumbent retired.New member elected.Democratic hold.
|  nowrap | 

|}

Georgia 

|-
! 
| James Lindsay Seward
|  | Democratic
| 1853
| Incumbent re-elected.
| nowrap | 

|-
! 
| Martin Jenkins Crawford
|  | Democratic
| 1855
| Incumbent re-elected.
| nowrap | 

|-
! 
| Robert Pleasant Trippe
|  | Know Nothing
| 1855
| Incumbent re-elected.
| nowrap | 

|-
! 
| Hiram B. Warner
|  | Democratic
| 1855
|  | Incumbent retired.New member elected.Democratic hold.
| nowrap | 

|-
! 
| John Henry Lumpkin
|  | Democratic
| 1855
|  | Incumbent retired.New member elected.Democratic hold.
| nowrap | 

|-
! 
| Howell Cobb
|  | Democratic
| 18421851 1855
|  | Incumbent retired.New member elected.Democratic hold.
| nowrap | 

|-
! 
| Nathaniel Greene Foster
|  | Know Nothing
| 1855
| bgcolor=lavender | Incumbent retired.New member elected.Know Nothing hold.
| nowrap | 

|-
! 
| Alexander H. Stephens
|  | Democratic
| 1843 
| Incumbent re-elected.
| nowrap | 

|}

Illinois 

|-
! 
| Elihu B. Washburne
|  | Republican
| 1852
| Incumbent re-elected.
| nowrap | 

|-
! 
| James Hutchinson Woodworth
|  | Republican
| 1854
|  | Incumbent retired.New member elected.Republican hold.
| nowrap | 

|-
! 
| Jesse O. Norton
|  | Republican
| 1852
|  | Incumbent retired.New member elected.Republican hold.
| nowrap | 

|-
! 
| James Knox
|  | Republican
| 1852
|  | Incumbent retired.New member elected.Republican hold.
| nowrap | 

|-
! 
| colspan=3 | Vacant
|  | Rep. William Alexander Richardson (D) resigned August 25, 1856, to run for governor of Illinois.New member elected.Democratic hold.Winner was not candidate for unexpired term, see above.
| nowrap | 

|-
! 
| Thomas L. Harris
|  | Democratic
| 18481850 1854
| Incumbent re-elected.
| nowrap | 

|-
! 
| colspan=3 | Vacant
|  | Rep. James C. Allen (D) resigned July 18, 1856, amid election contest.New member elected.Democratic hold.Winner was not candidate for unexpired term, see above.
| nowrap | 

|-
! 
| colspan=3 | Vacant
|  | Rep.-elect Lyman Trumbull (D) was later elected U.S. senator and took office March 4, 1855.New member elected.Democratic hold.Winner was not candidate for unexpired term, see above.
| nowrap | 

|-
! 
| Samuel S. Marshall
|  | Democratic
| 1854
| Incumbent re-elected.
| nowrap | 

|}

Indiana 

|-
! 
| Smith Miller
|  | Democratic
| 1852
|  | Incumbent retired.New member elected.Democratic hold.
| nowrap | 

|-
! 
| William Hayden English
|  | Democratic
| 1852
| Incumbent re-elected.
| nowrap | 

|-
! 
| George Grundy Dunn
|  | People's
| 1854
|  | Incumbent retired.New member elected.Democratic gain.
| nowrap | 

|-
! 
| William Cumback
|  | People's
| 1854
|  | Incumbent lost re-election.New member elected.Democratic gain.
| nowrap | 

|-
! 
| David P. Holloway
|  | People's
| 1854
|  | Incumbent retired.New member elected.Republican gain.
| nowrap | 

|-
! 
| Lucien Barbour
|  | People's
| 1854
|  | Incumbent retired.New member elected.Democratic gain.
| nowrap | 

|-
! 
| Harvey D. Scott
|  | People's
| 1854
|  | Incumbent retired.New member elected.Democratic gain.
| nowrap | 

|-
! 
| Daniel Mace
|  | People's
| 1851
|  | Incumbent retired.New member elected.Republican gain.
| nowrap | 

|-
! 
| Schuyler Colfax
|  | People's
| 1854
|  | Incumbent re-elected to a new party.Republican gain.
| nowrap | 

|-
! 
| Samuel Brenton
|  | People's
| 1854
|  | Incumbent re-elected to a new party.Republican gain.
| nowrap | 

|-
! 
| John U. Pettit
|  | People's
| 1854
|  | Incumbent re-elected to a new party.Republican gain.
| nowrap | 

|}

Iowa 

|-
! 
| Augustus Hall
|  | Democratic
| 1854
|  | Incumbent lost re-election.New member elected.Republican gain.
| nowrap | 

|-
! 
| James Thorington
|  | Whig
| 1854
|  | Incumbent lost renomination.New member elected.Republican gain.
| nowrap | 

|}

Kansas Territory 
See non-voting delegates, below.

Kentucky 

|-
! 
| Henry Cornelius Burnett
|  | Democratic
| 1855
| Incumbent re-elected.
| nowrap | 

|-
! 
| John P. Campbell Jr.
|  | Know Nothing
| 1855
|  | Incumbent withdrew.New member elected.Democratic gain.
| nowrap | 

|-
! 
| Warner Underwood
|  | Know Nothing
| 1855
| Incumbent re-elected.
| nowrap | 

|-
! 
| Albert G. Talbott
|  | Democratic
| 1855
| Incumbent re-elected.
| nowrap | 

|-
! 
| Joshua Jewett
|  | Democratic
| 1855
| Incumbent re-elected.
| nowrap | 

|-
! 
| John Milton Elliott
|  | Democratic
| 1853
| Incumbent re-elected.
| nowrap | 

|-
! 
| Humphrey Marshall
|  | Know Nothing
| 1855
| Incumbent re-elected.
| nowrap | 

|-
! 
| Alexander Keith Marshall
|  | Know Nothing
| 1855
|  | Incumbent retired.New member elected.Democratic gain.
| nowrap | 

|-
! 
| Leander Cox
|  | Know Nothing
| 1853
|  | Incumbent lost re-election.New member elected.Democratic gain.
| nowrap | 

|-
! 
| Samuel F. Swope
|  | Know Nothing
| 1855
|  | Incumbent retired.New member elected.Democratic gain.
| nowrap | 

|}

Louisiana 

|-
! 
| George Eustis Jr.
|  | Know Nothing
| 1855
| Incumbent re-elected.
| nowrap | 

|-
! 
| Miles Taylor
|  | Democratic
| 1855
| Incumbent re-elected.
| nowrap | 

|-
! 
| Thomas G. Davidson
|  | Democratic
| 1855
| Incumbent re-elected.
| nowrap | 

|-
! 
| John M. Sandidge
|  | Democratic
| 1855
| Incumbent re-elected.
| nowrap | 

|}

Maine 

|-
! 
| John M. Wood
|  | Republican
| 1854
| Incumbent re-elected.
| nowrap | 

|-
! 
| John J. Perry
|  | Republican
| 1854
|  | Incumbent retired.New member elected.Republican hold.
| nowrap | 

|-
! 
| Ebenezer Knowlton
|  | Republican
| 1854
|  | Incumbent retired.New member elected.Republican hold.
| nowrap | 

|-
! 
| Samuel P. Benson
|  | Republican
| 1852
|  | Incumbent retired.New member elected.Republican hold.
| nowrap | 

|-
! 
| Israel Washburn Jr.
|  | Republican
| 1850
| Incumbent re-elected.
| nowrap | 

|-
! 
| Thomas J. D. Fuller
|  | Democratic
| 1848
|  | Incumbent retired.New member elected.Republican gain.
| nowrap | 

|}

Maryland 

|-
! 

|-
! 

|-
! 

|-
! 

|-
! 

|-
! 

|}

Massachusetts 

|-
! 
| Robert B. Hall
|  | Know Nothing
| 1854
|  | Incumbent re-elected to a new party.Republican gain.
| nowrap | 

|-
! 
| James Buffinton
|  | Know Nothing
| 1854
|  | Incumbent re-elected to a new party.Republican gain.
| nowrap | 

|-
! 
| William S. Damrell
|  | Know Nothing
| 1854
|  | Incumbent re-elected to a new party.Republican gain.
| nowrap | 

|-
! 
| Linus B. Comins
|  | Know Nothing
| 1854
|  | Incumbent re-elected to a new party.Republican gain.
| nowrap | 

|-
! 
| Anson Burlingame
|  | Know Nothing
| 1854
|  | Incumbent re-elected to a new party.Republican gain.
| nowrap | 

|-
! 
| Timothy Davis
|  | Know Nothing
| 1854
|  | Incumbent re-elected to a new party.Republican gain.
| nowrap | 

|-
! 
| Nathaniel P. Banks
|  | Know Nothing
| 1852
|  | Incumbent re-elected to a new party.Republican gain.
| nowrap | 

|-
! 
| Chauncey L. Knapp
|  | Know Nothing
| 1854
|  | Incumbent re-elected to a new party.Republican gain.
| nowrap | 

|-
! 
| Alexander DeWitt
|  | Know Nothing
| 1852
|  | Incumbent lost re-election.New member elected.Republican gain.
| nowrap | 

|-
! 
| Calvin C. Chaffee
|  | Know Nothing
| 1855 (special)
|  | Incumbent re-elected to a new party.Republican gain.
| nowrap | 

|-
! 
| Mark Trafton
|  | Know Nothing
| 1854
|  | Incumbent lost re-election.New member elected.Republican gain.
| nowrap | 

|}

Michigan 

|-
! 
| William A. Howard
| 
| 1854
| Incumbent re-elected.
| nowrap | 

|-
! 
| Henry Waldron
| 
| 1854
| Incumbent re-elected.
| nowrap | 

|-
! 
| David S. Walbridge
| 
| 1854
| Incumbent re-elected.
| nowrap | 

|-
! 
| George W. Peck
| 
| 1854
|  | Incumbent lost re-election.New member elected.Republican gain.
| nowrap | 

|}

Minnesota 

Minnesota Territory elected three members in advance of Minnesota's 1848 statehood.  "Although three men won this election, which was held before Minnesota was actually a state, only two representatives from Minnesota were allowed in the congressional bill creating the state in 1858. George L. Becker lost in the drawing of lots to decide who would present their credentials, therefore he did not serve in Congress."

|-
! rowspan=2 | 
| colspan=3 | None 
|  | New state would be admitted May 11, 1858.New member elected.Democratic gain.
| rowspan=2 nowrap | 

|-
| colspan=3 | None 
|  | New state would be admitted May 11, 1858.New member elected.Democratic gain.

|}

Mississippi 

Elections held late, from October 5 to 6, 1857.

|-
! 
| Daniel B. Wright
|  | Democratic
| 1853
|  | Incumbent retired.New member elected.Democratic hold. 
| nowrap | 

|-
! 
| Hendley S. Bennett
|  | Democratic
| 1855
|  | Incumbent lost renomination.New member elected.Democratic hold. 
| nowrap | 

|-
! 
| William Barksdale
|  | Democratic
| 1853
| Incumbent re-elected.
| nowrap | 

|-
! 
| William A. Lake
|  | Know Nothing
| 1855
|  | Incumbent lost re-election.New member elected.Democratic gain.  
| nowrap | 

|-
! 
| John A. Quitman
|  | Democratic
| 1855
| Incumbent re-elected.
| nowrap | 

|}

Missouri 

|-
! 

|-
! 

|-
! 

|-
! 

|-
! 

|-
! 

|-
! 

|}

Nebraska Territory 
See non-voting delegates, below.

New Hampshire 

|-
! 

|-
! 

|-
! 

|}

New Jersey 

|-
! 

|-
! 

|-
! 

|-
! 

|-
! 

|}

New York 

|-
! 

|-
! 

|-
! 

|-
! 

|-
! 

|-
! 

|-
! 

|-
! 

|-
! 

|-
! 

|-
! 

|-
! 

|-
! 

|-
! 

|-
! 

|-
! 

|-
! 

|-
! 

|-
! 

|-
! 

|-
! 

|-
! 

|-
! 

|-
! 

|-
! 

|-
! 

|-
! 

|-
! 

|-
! 

|-
! 

|-
! 

|-
! 

|-
! 

|}

North Carolina 

|-
! 

|-
! 

|-
! 

|-
! 

|-
! 

|-
! 

|-
! 

|-
! 

|}

Ohio 

|-
! 

|-
! 

|-
! 

|-
! 

|-
! 

|-
! 

|-
! 

|-
! 

|-
! 

|-
! 

|-
! 

|-
! 

|-
! 

|-
! 

|-
! 

|-
! 

|-
! 

|-
! 

|-
! 

|-
! 

|-
! 

|}

Oregon Territory 
See non-voting delegates, below.

Pennsylvania 

|-
! 

|-
! 

|-
! 

|-
! 

|-
! 

|-
! 

|-
! 

|-
! 

|-
! 

|-
! 

|-
! 

|-
! 

|-
! 

|-
! 

|-
! 

|-
! 

|-
! 

|-
! 

|-
! 

|-
! 

|-
! 

|-
! 

|-
! 

|-
! 

|-
! 

|}

Rhode Island 

|-
! 

|-
! 

|}

South Carolina 

|-
! 

|-
! 

|-
! 

|-
! 

|-
! 

|-
! 

|}

Tennessee 

|-
! 
| Albert G. Watkins
|  | Democratic
| 1855
| Incumbent re-elected.
| nowrap | 

|-
! 
| William H. Sneed
|  | Know Nothing
| 1855
| bgcolor=lavender | Incumbent retired.New member elected.Know Nothing hold.
| nowrap | 

|-
! 
| Samuel A. Smith
|  | Democratic
| 1853
| Incumbent re-elected.
| nowrap | 

|-
! 
| John H. Savage
|  | Democratic
| 1855
| Incumbent re-elected.
|  nowrap | 

|-
! 
| Charles Ready
|  | Know Nothing
| 1853
| Incumbent re-elected.
| nowrap | 

|-
! 
| George W. Jones
|  | Democratic
| 1842
| Incumbent re-elected.
|  George W. Jones (Democratic) 100%

|-
! 
| John V. Wright
|  | Democratic
| 1855
| Incumbent re-elected.
| nowrap | 

|-
! 
| Felix Zollicoffer
|  | Know Nothing
| 1853
| Incumbent re-elected.
| nowrap | 

|-
! 
| Emerson Etheridge
|  | Know Nothing
| 1853
|  |Incumbent lost re-election.New member elected.Democratic gain.
| nowrap | 

|-
! 
| Thomas Rivers
|  | Know Nothing
| 1855
|  |Incumbent retired.New member elected.Democratic gain.
| nowrap | 

|}

Texas 

|-
! 

|-
! 

|}

Vermont 

|-
! 

|-
! 

|-
! 

|}

Virginia 

|-
! 

|-
! 

|-
! 

|-
! 

|-
! 

|-
! 

|-
! 

|-
! 

|-
! 

|-
! 

|-
! 

|-
! 

|-
! 

|}

Wisconsin 

Election results in Wisconsin for 1856:

|-
! 
| Daniel Wells Jr.
|  | Democratic
| 1852
|  | Incumbent retired.New member elected.Republican gain.
| nowrap | 

|-
! 
| Cadwallader C. Washburn
|  | Republican
| 1854
| Incumbent re-elected.
| nowrap | 

|-
! 
| Charles Billinghurst
|  | Republican
| 1854
| Incumbent re-elected.
| nowrap | 
|}

Non-voting delegates 

|-
! 
| John Wilkins Whitfield
|  | Democratic
| 18541856 1856 
|  | Unknown if incumbent retired or lost re-election.New delegate elected.Democratic hold.
| nowrap | 

|-
! 
| Henry Mower Rice
|  | Democratic
| 1852
|  | Incumbent retired.New delegate elected.Democratic hold.District eliminated in 1858 upon Minnesota's statehood.
| nowrap | 

|-
! 
| Bird Chapman
|  | Democratic
| 1854
|  | Incumbent lost re-election.New delegate elected August 3, 1857.Independent Democratic gain.
| nowrap | 

|-
! 
| Joseph Lane
|  | Democratic
| 1851
| Incumbent re-elected.
| nowrap | 

|}

See also 
 1856 United States elections
 1856 United States presidential election
 1856–57 United States Senate elections
 List of United States House of Representatives elections (1856–present)
 34th United States Congress
 35th United States Congress

Notes

References

Bibliography

External links 
 Office of the Historian (Office of Art & Archives, Office of the Clerk, U.S. House of Representatives)